The Swallow's Nest is a decorative castle located at Gaspra, a small spa town  between Yalta and Alupka on the Crimean peninsula in Ukraine. It was built between 1911 and 1912, on top of the  Aurora Cliff, in a Neo-Gothic design by the Russian architect Leonid Sherwood for the Baltic German businessman Baron von Steingel.

The castle overlooks the Cape of Ai-Todor on the Black Sea coast and is located near the remains of the Roman castrum of Charax. The Swallow's Nest is one of the most popular visitor attractions in Crimea, having become the symbol of Crimea's southern coastline.

Description

Its original design envisioned a foyer, guest room, stairway to the tower, and two bedrooms on two different levels within the tower. The interior of the guest room is decorated with wooden panels; the walls of the rest of the rooms are stuccoed and painted. An observation deck rings the building, providing a view of the sea, and Yalta's distant shoreline.

History
The first building on the Aurora Cliff was constructed for a Russian general circa 1895. The first structure he built was a wooden cottage romantically named the "Castle of Love." Later on, the ownership of the cottage passed to A. K. Tobin, a court doctor to the Russian tsar.

In 1911, Baron von Steingel, a Baltic German noble who had made a fortune extracting oil in Baku, acquired the timber cottage and within a year had it replaced with the current building called Schwalbennest. The Scots Baronial and Moorish Revival styles had been introduced in the Crimea in the 1820s by Edward Blore, the architect of the Vorontsov Palace (1828–46). Compared to the Alupka and Koreiz palaces, the Swallow's Nest is closer in style to various German fairy-tale-inspired castle follies, such as Lichtenstein Castle, Neuschwanstein Castle and Stolzenfels Castle, although its precarious seaside setting on the cliffs draws parallels with the Belém Tower in Portugal, or Miramare Castle on the Gulf of Trieste outside Trieste, Italy.

In 1914, von Steingel sold the building to P. G. Shelaputin to be used as a restaurant. For a short time after the 1917 Russian Revolution, the building was used only as a tourist attraction. In 1927, the Swallow's Nest survived a serious earthquake rated at 6 to 7 on the Richter scale. The building was not damaged apart from some small decorative items that were thrown into the sea along with a small portion of the cliff. However, the cliff itself developed a huge crack. In the 1930s, the building was used by a reading club from the nearby "Zhemchuzhina" (Pearl) resort, however it was closed shortly thereafter as a safety precaution due to the damage it had suffered in the quake, remaining closed for the next 40 years.

Renovation and restoration of the building began in 1968. The project involved the restoration of a small portion of the castle and the addition of a monolithic console concrete plate to strengthen the cliff. Since 1975, a restaurant has operated within the building. In 2011, the Swallow's Nest was closed for three months due to major restoration work estimated to cost 1,200,000 hryvnias ($150,000 USD).

In culture

Owing to its important status as the symbol of the Crimea's southern coast, the Swallow's Nest was featured in several Soviet films. It was used as the setting of Desyat Negrityat, the 1987 Soviet screen version of Agatha Christie's And Then There Were None. The building was also featured in the 1983 Polish/Soviet co-production children's film Mister Blot's Academy as well as in Mio in the Land of Faraway, a 1987 joint production by Swedish, Norwegian, and Soviet film companies.

See also
 Tsar's Path, scenic pathway located near the Swallow's Nest
 Foros Church, similarly located attraction overlooking the Black Sea littoral near Yalta
 Belém Tower, similar structure in Lisbon, Portugal

References
Notes

Footnotes

Bibliography

External links

  
 
 

Houses completed in 1912
Tourist attractions in Crimea
Folly buildings
Buildings and structures in Crimea
Yalta Municipality
1912 establishments in the Russian Empire
1912 establishments in Ukraine
Tourist attractions in Ukraine
Cultural heritage monuments of federal significance in Crimea